Ciemniewo may refer to the following places:
Ciemniewo, Ciechanów County in Masovian Voivodeship (east-central Poland)
Ciemniewo, Maków County in Masovian Voivodeship (east-central Poland)
Ciemniewo, Płońsk County in Masovian Voivodeship (east-central Poland)